Zhangfang Town is a suburban town in the Fangshan District of Beijing.

The town was historically a crucial military station, and was named Zhangfang as a result. Later the name was corrupted to Zhangfang (张坊) of today.

History

Administrative divisions
In the year 2021, the town was divided into 15 villages:
 Dayugou Village
 Beibaidai Village
 Caijiakou Village
 Dongguanshang Village
 Sanhezhuang Village
 Wagou Village
 Ganhekou Village
 Mujiakou Village
 Guangluzhuang Village
 Nanbaidai Village
 Xibaidai Village
 Shigezhuang Village
 Zhangfang Village
 Pianshang Village
 Xiasi Village

Geography
Juma River, a tributary of the Daqing River, flows northwest to southeast through the town.

Mountains located adjacent to and visible from the townsite are: Dawajian, Baihujiao, Zhuanghushan, and Ma'anshan.

Education

Zhangfang Town has four public primary schools and one middle school.

Economy
The local economy is primarily based upon agriculture and tourism.

Persimmon is important to the local economy.

Religion
Yunju Temple is a Buddhist temple in the town, which was originally built during the Northern Qi dynasty (550–570).

Transportation
The Beijing–Tongliao railway, from Beijing to Tongliao in the Inner Mongolia Autonomous Region, runs through the town.

Attractions
The main attractions are the Zhangfang Shang and Zhou Dynasties Site, Xianxi Cave, and Jiulong Pond.

Notable people
 Guo Shihong, revolutionary martyr.
 Guo Yongsheng, revolutionary martyr.

See also 
 List of township-level divisions of Beijing

References

External links
 

Fangshan District
Towns in Beijing